Robert Warington, Jr.  (22 August 1838, Spitalfields, London – 20 March 1907, Harpenden) was an English agricultural chemist, known for his research and publications on the chemistry of phosphates and nitrates in agricultural soils.

Biography
Robert Warington Jr. was the eldest son and second child of the chemist Robert Warington, FRS. After studying chemistry in his father's laboratory and attending lectures by Faraday, Brande, and Hofmann, Robert Warington Jr. became in 1859 an unpaid assistant to Sir John Bennet Lawes at Rothamsted Experimental Station at Harpenden. Warington was from 1862 to 1867 an assistant to the Professor of Chemistry at the Royal Agricultural College at Cirencester.

He was from 1876 to 1891 an investigator at Rothamsted Experimental Stations, where he published many articles on soil nitrification. R. Warington here made the first observation that nitrification is a two-step process in 1879.

In 1891 Warington was appointed by the committee for the Lawes Agricultural Trust to give six lecture in the United States before the Association of American Agricultural Colleges and Experimental Stations at Washington, D.C. from August 12 to 18, 1891. The lectures dealt mainly with the subject of soil nitrification, based upon his own research at Rothamsted. When he returned to England, he did research at Lawes's Millwall laboratory. He was appointed in 1894 as an examiner in agriculture for the science and art department of the University of Oxford and was for three years, from 1894 to 1897, the Sibthorpian professor of rural economy at the University of Oxford.

He was elected in 1863 a Fellow of the Chemical Society and in 1886 a Fellow of the Royal Society.

In 1884 Robert Warrington Jr. married Helen Louisa (1855–1898), third daughter of George H. Makins, M.R.C.S., chief assayer to the Bank of England. Robert Warington Jr. and his first wife had five daughters: Elizabeth (Betty) born in 1888; Margaret born in 1890; Dorothy, born in 1892; and twins, Katherine and Helen (Kitty and Nell) born in 1897. In 1902 he married Rosa Jane, daughter of Frederick Robert Spackman, M.D., of Harpenden. Katherine Warington (1897–1993) became a famous botanist. Robert Warington Jr is buried with many of his family in a family plot in St Nicholas Churchyard, Harpenden, England.

Selected publications

References 

1838 births
1907 deaths
19th-century British chemists
20th-century British chemists
Agricultural chemists
Academics of the Royal Agricultural University
Academics of the University of Oxford
Rothamsted Experimental Station people
Fellows of the Chemical Society
Fellows of the Royal Society